Mataz Saleh Abd Raboh Bayt Abd Raboh (born 28 May 1996), commonly known as Mataz Saleh, is an Omani footballer who plays for Dhofar in the Oman Professional League and the Oman national football team as a midfielder.

Career

International
Saleh made his debut for the Oman national football team in a friendly match on 8 August 2016 against Turkmenistan. He was included in Oman's squad for the 2019 AFC Asian Cup in the United Arab Emirates.

Career statistics

International
Statistics accurate as of match played 30 December 2018

International goals
Scores and results list Oman's goal tally first.

References

External links

1996 births
Living people
Omani footballers
Oman international footballers
Association football midfielders
Dhofar Club players
Oman Professional League players
2019 AFC Asian Cup players